The Nashville Vols were a Minor League Baseball team that played in Nashville, Tennessee, from 1901 to 1963; they were inactive in 1962 due to declining attendance and the Southern Association ceasing operations after 1961. Over 62 seasons, 1,221 players competed in at least one game for the Vols. Of those, 566 also played in at least one game for a Major League Baseball team. Seventeen players served in the position of manager concurrent with their on-field playing.

The Nashville Baseball Club was formed as a charter member of the newly organized Southern Association in 1901. The team did not receive its official moniker, the Nashville Volunteers, until 1908. However, the team was, and is, commonly referred to as the Vols. Their last season in the Southern Association was 1961. After sitting out the 1962 season, Nashville returned for a final campaign as a part of the South Atlantic League in 1963. Over their 62-year existence, the Vols competed at four class levels: Class B (1901), Class A (1902–1935), Class A1 (1936–1945), and Double-A (1946–1961, 1963).

Today, all Minor League Baseball teams are affiliated with a Major League Baseball team to develop players for the major league club. However, it was not until the 1930s that Nashville entered into such major league affiliations on a consistent basis. The Vols were affiliated with eight teams throughout their history: the Cleveland Naps (1908), Chicago White Sox (1920), New York Giants (1934–1935 and 1952–1954), Cincinnati Reds (1936–1937 and 1955–1960), Brooklyn Dodgers (1938–1940), Chicago Cubs (1943–1951), Minnesota Twins (1961), and Los Angeles Angels (1963).

Twenty-four of the team's players distinguished themselves after their playing time in Nashville by winning a Major League Baseball award, being named to a major league All-Star team, or being elected to the National Baseball Hall of Fame. Jake Daubert and Bucky Walters each won Most Valuable Player Awards. Dusty Rhodes won the Babe Ruth Award. Johnny Edwards won a Gold Glove Award. Twenty-one alumni were selected to play in the Major League Baseball All-Star Game. Kiki Cuyler and Waite Hoyt have been elected to the National Baseball Hall of Fame.

Table keys

Players

Notes
Table keys

MLB award winners and All-Stars

References
Specific

General
1901: 
1902–1935: 
1936–1945: 
1946–1961: 
1963: 

All-time roster